Barak Kol may refer to:
 Barak Kol (lake)
 Barak Kol (physicist)

See also
 Barakol, a chemical compound